Edward George Watson (born 28 April 1895) was an English footballer who played in the Football League for Coventry City and Wolverhampton Wanderers.

References

English footballers
Association football defenders
English Football League players
Portsmouth F.C. players
Pontypridd F.C. players
Wolverhampton Wanderers F.C. players
Coventry City F.C. players
Oakengates Athletic F.C. players
1895 births
20th-century deaths
Year of death missing